Onorionde Kughegbe John (born July 22, 1983), commonly known as O.K. John, is a Nigerian-born Indonesian professional footballer who plays as a central defender for Liga 1 club RANS Nusantara.

Club career

Madura United
In February 2018, he signed a one-year contract with Liga 1 club Madura United. John made his league debut on 26 March 2018 in a match against Barito Putera at the Gelora Ratu Pamelingan Stadium, Pamekasan.

Persebaya Surabaya (loan)
In July 2018, he joined Liga 1 side Persebaya Surabaya on an undisclosed loan term from Madura United. John made his league debut on 18 July 2018 in a match against PSMS Medan. John scored his first goal for Persebaya against Sriwijaya in the 20th minute at the Gelora Sriwijaya Stadium, Palembang.

Kalteng Putra
He was signed for Kalteng Putra to play in Liga 1 in the 2019 season. John made his league debut on 16 May 2019 in a match against PSIS Semarang at the Moch. Soebroto Stadium, Magelang. John made 28 league appearances and did not score a goal for Kalteng Putra.

Barito Putera
In 2020, O.K. John signed a contract with Indonesian Liga 1 club Barito Putera. He made his league debut on 29 February 2020 in a match against Madura United at the Gelora Ratu Pamelingan Stadium, Pamekasan. John made 2 league appearances and did not score a goal for Barito Putera.

PSMS Medan
He was signed for PSMS Medan to play in the Liga 2 in the 2020 season. This season was suspended on 27 March 2020 due to the COVID-19 pandemic. The season was abandoned and was declared void on 20 January 2021.

Persik Kediri
In 2021, O.K. John signed a contract with Indonesian club Persik Kediri to play in Liga 1 in the 2021 season. He made his league debut on 27 August 2021, in a 1–0 loss against Bali United at the Gelora Bung Karno Stadium, Jakarta. John made 6 league appearances and did not score a goal for Persik Kediri.

RANS Nusantara
O.K. John was signed for RANS Nusantara to play in Liga 1 in the 2022–23 season. He made his league debut on 23 July 2022 in a match against PSIS Semarang at the Jatidiri Stadium, Semarang.

References

External links
 O.K. John at Soccerway
 O.K. John at Liga Indonesia

1983 births
Living people
Nigerian footballers
Nigerian expatriate footballers
Association football central defenders
Expatriate footballers in Indonesia
Expatriate footballers in Malaysia
Liga 1 (Indonesia) players
Malaysia Super League players
Nigerian expatriate sportspeople in Indonesia
Nigerian expatriate sportspeople in Malaysia
Persidafon Dafonsoro players
Gresik United players
Persiwa Wamena players
Persik Kediri players
Persebaya Surabaya players
PDRM FA players
UiTM FC players
Mitra Kukar players
Persija Jakarta players
Madura United F.C. players
Kalteng Putra F.C. players
PS Barito Putera players
PSMS Medan players
RANS Nusantara F.C. players
Naturalised citizens of Indonesia
Indonesian people of Nigerian descent